In enzymology, a riboflavin kinase is an enzyme that catalyzes the chemical reaction

ATP + riboflavin  ADP + FMN

Thus, the two substrates of this enzyme are ATP and riboflavin, whereas its two products are ADP and FMN.

Riboflavin is converted into catalytically active cofactors (FAD and FMN) by the actions of riboflavin kinase, which converts it into FMN, and FAD synthetase, which adenylates FMN to FAD. Eukaryotes usually have two separate enzymes, while most prokaryotes have a single bifunctional protein that can carry out both catalyses, although exceptions occur in both cases. While eukaryotic monofunctional riboflavin kinase is orthologous to the bifunctional prokaryotic enzyme, the monofunctional FAD synthetase differs from its prokaryotic counterpart, and is instead related to the PAPS-reductase family. The bacterial FAD synthetase that is part of the bifunctional enzyme has remote similarity to nucleotidyl transferases and, hence, it may be involved in the adenylylation reaction of FAD synthetases.

This enzyme belongs to the family of transferases, to be specific, those transferring phosphorus-containing groups (phosphotransferases) with an alcohol group as acceptor.  The systematic name of this enzyme class is ATP:riboflavin 5'-phosphotransferase. This enzyme is also called flavokinase.  This enzyme participates in riboflavin metabolism.

However, archaeal riboflavin kinases in general utilize CTP rather than ATP as the donor nucleotide, catalyzing the reaction

CTP + riboflavin  CDP + FMN 

Riboflavin kinase can also be isolated from other types of bacteria, all with similar function but a different number of amino acids.

Structure 

The complete enzyme arrangement can be observed with X-ray crystallography and with NMR. 
The riboflavin kinase enzyme isolated from Thermoplasma acidophilum contains 220 amino acids.  The structure of this enzyme has been determined X-ray crystallography at a resolution of 2.20 Å. Its secondary structure contains 69 residues (30%) in alpha helix form, and 60 residues (26%) a beta sheet conformation. The enzyme contains a magnesium binding site at amino acids 131 and 133, and a Flavin mononucleotide binding site at amino acids 188 and 195.

References

Further reading 

 
 
 
 
 
 
 

EC 2.7.1
Enzymes of known structure